Parascotia fuliginaria, the waved black, is a species of moth of the family Erebidae. It is found in Europe as far east as the Ural Mountains, in Armenia and Asia Minor, and is an introduced species in North America.

Technical description and variation

P.fuliginaria L.Forewing blackish fuscous; lines yellowish ochreous, edged with black; the outer dentate, the subterminal waved; a black mark at end of cell; hindwing like forewing; — the ab. flava Horm., from the Bukowina, has in the male quite pale ochreous wings, with two blackish fasciae in middle of wing and almost obsolete terminal spots; the female is pale yellowish brown, with darker dusting, especially in the basal and terminal areas; — ab. carbonaria Esp. is wholly black. Larva black; dorsal stripe white, swollen in places, with a black line in middle; several fine, interrupted, wavy, whitish lateral lines; tubercles large, with long hairs, those on the sides and the hind pair on each dorsal segment orange; head black, with yellow lines. The wingspan is 18–28 mm. The length of the forewings is 11–14 mm.

Biology
The moth flies from June to October depending on the location.

The larvae feed on various fungi, such as Fomitopsis betulina, and Trametes versicolor and also on lichens.

References

External links
 Waved Black at UK Moths
 Lepiforum.de
 Vlindernet.nl 

Boletobiinae
Moths described in 1761
Moths of Asia
Moths of Europe
Moths of North America
Taxa named by Carl Linnaeus